The Kalahari Red is a breed of goat originating from South Africa. Their name is derived from their red coat and the Kalahari Desert. They are generally used in meat production. The Kalahari Red goat has adapted to resist their harsh environment, having their red coats as a means of protection against sunlight and naturally built to resist diseases.

References

External links
 Kalahari Reds Home
 Kalahari Reds archived from the  original
 Kalahari Red Goat 
Goat breeds
Meat goat breeds
Goat breeds originating in South Africa